Hoseynabad-e Akhund (also Romanized as Ḩoseynābād-e Ākhūnd and Ḩoseynābād Ākhvond; also known as Hosein Abad Akhond and Ḩoseynābād) is a village in Mohammadabad Rural District, in the Central District of Zarand County, Kerman Province, Iran. At the 2006 census, its population was 552, in 139 families.

References 

Populated places in Zarand County